Cunji may refer to,

 Cunji, Guinea-Bissau, place in West Africa 
 Tunicate, various sea squirt species known as cunji in Australia